The Journal of Psychiatry & Neuroscience is a bimonthly open access peer-reviewed scientific journal covering research in psychiatry and neuroscience concerning the mechanisms involved in the etiology and treatment of psychiatric disorders. The journal was established in 1976 as the Psychiatric Journal of the University of Ottawa and obtained its current title in 1991. It is published by the Canadian Medical Association and the current (2021) editors-in-chief are Paul Albert and Ridha Joober (McGill University).

Abstracting and indexing 
The journal is abstracted and indexed in Index Medicus/MEDLINE/PubMed, Science Citation Index, Social Sciences Citation Index, Current Contents/Social & Behavioral Sciences, and BIOSIS Previews. According to the Journal Citation Reports, the journal has a 2014 impact factor of 5.861.

References

External links 
 

Neuroscience journals
Psychiatry journals
Bimonthly journals
Publications established in 1976
English-language journals
Academic journals published by learned and professional societies